The fawn-breasted wren (Cantorchilus guarayanus) is a species of bird in the family Troglodytidae. It is found in Bolivia, Brazil, and Paraguay.

Taxonomy and systematics

The fawn-breasted wren has sometimes been treated as conspecific with the buff-breasted wren (Cantorchilus leucotis), though they have very different vocalizations. The species is monotypic.

Description

Adults have a plain medium brown crown and upperparts that becomes rufescent on the lower back and rump. Their tail is reddish brown with crisp black bars. They have a narrow white supercilium mostly behind the eye, cheeks mottled gray-white and blackish, and black malar and moustacial stripes. Their chin is whitish, the chest a warm orange-buff, and the belly and vent area a deeper orange-buff. Juveniles are similar but their facial markings are less distinct.

Distribution and habitat

The fawn-breasted wren is found across much of northeastern Bolivia, a fairly thin slice of adjacent western Brazil, and a small part of northeastern Paraguay. It inhabits várzea scrubland and secondary forest, mostly near water.

Behavior

Feeding

The fawn-breasted wren forages in pairs during the dry season and small family groups after nesting. Its diet has not been documented.

Breeding

Only a few fawn-breasted wren nests have been described, and little has been published about its breeding phenology. The clutch size is two.

Vocalization

The members of a fawn-breasted wren pair sing antiphonally, the male's part  a "cheerilo-choli" and the female's "pew-pew, pew-pew". Calls include a repeated "pew-pew" and harsh clicks.

Status

The IUCN has assessed the fawn-breasted wren as being of Least Concern. Though its population size has not been determined, it is believed to be fairly common to common across its range.

References

External links
Fawn-breasted Wren on the Internet Bird Collection
Article w/Graphic of wren oiseaux.net

Cantorchilus
Birds of the Pantanal
Birds of Bolivia
Birds of Paraguay
Birds of Brazil
Birds described in 1837
Taxonomy articles created by Polbot